The Chinese-American Composite Wing (Provisional) was a combined United States Army Air Forces and  Republic of China Air Force unit. It was administratively assigned under Fourteenth Air Force in China throughout its service from 1 October 1943 – 1 August 1945. CACW succeeded the  First American Volunteer Group (AVG) after AVG was disbanded in July 1942. The AVG's famed nickname Flying Tigers was also adopted by CACW. CACW leadership was led by previous AVG commander Clare Lee Chennault, who was promoted to the rank of Major-General.

Its operational units were jointly commanded by American and Chinese air force officers, and its aircraft were manned by American and Chinese pilots and air crewmen.

The 1st, 3rd and 5th Groups of CACW later operate in Taiwan, reorganized as 443rd, 427th and 401st Tactical Fighter Wings of the Taiwanese Republic of China Air Force.

Operational history 
[[File:Chinese Polikarpov I-15bis.jpg|thumb|Xu Jixiang of the 17th PS, 5th PG, leaning on an I-15bis, the fighter aircraft he fought against the IJNAF [[Mitsubishi A6M Zero|A6M Zero]]s debut aerial-combat engagement on 13 September 1940 during the Battle of Chongqing, enduring and surviving the arduous 1/2-hour long battle against the new Japanese air-superiority fighter; Xu would exact a measure of personal revenge on 4 March 1944 when he shot down an A6M Zero over the Japanese airbase at Qiongshan, Hainan, whilst flying a P-40 Warhawk with the CACW]] 
Aircraft assigned to the CACW included late-series P-40 Warhawks (with the Nationalist Chinese Air Force blue sky with 12-pointed white sun national insignia, rudder markings and squadron/aircraft numbering) and B-25 "Mitchell" medium bombers.  The Mitchells included the B-25D & later B-25J series level bombers, the B-25H series attack/ gunship versions equipped with a 75-millimeter cannon in the nose. The Mitchell markings were like the CACW's fighters, wearing the Nationalist Chinese star insignia on the wings and fuselage. In late 1944, USAAF-marked P-51 Mustangs of the B and C series began to be assigned to CACW pilots. Then, in early 1945, "D" and "K" series arrived. Those series differed in details such as the propeller but shared many external characteristics including the bubble canopy.

All U.S. pilots assigned to the CACW were listed as rated pilots in Chinese Air Force, and were authorized to wearing both pilot's wings of both nations.

During its year and a half of operations, the Chinese and American airmen of the CACW could claim the destruction of 190 Japanese aircraft in air-to-air combat, and 301 more on the ground. The fighters and bombers of the CACW had destroyed at least 1500 Japanese vehicles and sunk several hundred thousand tons of Japanese merchant and naval shipping, in addition they had taken a heavy toll on Japanese ground troops, facilities, railroads and bridges. In that same time, they had lost 35 fighters and 8 bombers to enemy ground fire, and 20 fighters to Japanese aircraft. However, not a single CACW bomber had been lost to enemy fighters, a tribute to the abilities of the Wing's B-25 aircrews, and the quality of the escort protection provided by the Wing's fighter pilots.

The most successful fighter pilot of the CACW was Lt. Colonel William Norman Reed, who had first fought in China as a member of the AVG. As a "Flying Tiger," Reed had destroyed 3 Japanese aircraft in aerial combat and 8 more on the ground. Then returning to China to command the CACW's 7th Fighter Squadron and eventually its 3d Fighter Group, he would destroy an additional 6 Japanese aircraft in aerial combat.  According to the book China Bombers by Ken Daniels, Reed was killed while parachuting from a disabled P-40 on December 19, 1944.

Another known CACW member, Captain Ho Weng Toh, is reportedly the last surviving member of the Flying Tigers in Singapore and Asia. In 1944, Captain Ho flew the B-25 Mitchell as a bomber pilot in China with the CACW, after he was trained with the United States Army Air Forces (predecessor of United States Air Force) in Arizona. Captain Ho is also widely considered as the first Singaporean military officer trained by the United States Air Force, and the newest generation of Republic of Singapore Air Force fighter pilots are now trained at Luke Air Force Base, Arizona. Becoming a commercial pilot after World War 2, Captain Ho retired in 1980 as Chief Pilot of Singapore Airlines, being one of the airline's pioneering pilots.

 Stations 
Most CACW bases existed near the boundary of Japanese-Occupied China, and one "Valley Field" existed in an area within Japanese-held territory. Specific field locations include Hanchung, Ankang, Hsian, Laohokow, Enshih, Liangshan, Peishyi, Chihkiang, Hengyang, Kweilin, Liuchow, Chanyi, Suichwan, and Lingling.

 Lineage 
 Initially formed on 31 July 1943 as the 1st Bomb Group (Provisional) and the 3rd Fighter Group (Provisional), Republic of China Air Force
 Established as: Chinese American Composite Wing (Provisional), USAAF, and activated on 1 October 1943
 Inactivated on 19 September 1945

 Components 

 1st Bombardment Gp (Provisional)
 1st Bombardment Sq (Provisional)
 2nd Bombardment Sq (Provisional)
 3d Bombardment Sq (Provisional)
 4th Bombardment Sq (Provisional)

 3d Fighter Gp (Provisional)
 7th Fighter Sq (Provisional)
 8th Fighter Sq (Provisional)
 28th Fighter Sq (Provisional)
 32nd Fighter Sq (Provisional)

 5th Fighter Gp (Provisional)
 17th Fighter Sq (Provisional)
 26th Fighter Sq (Provisional)
 27th Fighter Sq (Provisional)
 29th Fighter Sq (Provisional)

 Aircraft 
 P-40 Warhawk, 1943–1945
 P-51 Mustang, 1944–1945
 B-25 Mitchell, 1943–1945

ReferencesBibliography'''

 Cheung, Raymond. OSPREY AIRCRAFT OF THE ACES 126: Aces of the Republic of China Air Force. Oxford: Bloomsbury Publishing Plc, 2015. .
 徐 (Xú), 露梅 (Lùméi). 隕落 (Fallen): 682位空军英烈的生死档案 - 抗战空军英烈档案大解密 (A Decryption of 682 Air Force Heroes of The War of Resistance-WWII and Their Martyrdom)''. 东城区, 北京， 中国: 团结出版社, 2016. .

External links
 Chinese-American Composite Wing

Multinational air units and formations
Military units and formations of the Republic of China
Wings of the United States Army Air Forces in World War II
Military units and formations established in 1943
Military units and formations disestablished in 1945